The Observer's Books are a series of small, pocket-sized books, published by Frederick Warne & Co in the United Kingdom from 1937 to 2003. They covered topics such as hobbies, art, history and wildlife. Intended for children, the aim of these books was to interest the observer. Some of them have become collector's items. For the dedicated collector this could be a lifetime's work as there are over 800 variations, some of which are now rare. The values of the books can vary from 50 pence to hundreds of pounds.  

The books were printed with plain paper dust jackets until 1969. Each one had a unique pattern of squiggly lines at the top but these were not especially practical because they were easy to rip and stain. From 1970, the covers were protected with a glossy coating. These types are often referred to as "Glossies". From the late 1970s, Warne laminated the covers to the actual books to make them sturdier and more resistant to wear.

The first Observer's guide was published in 1937, and was on the subject of British birds. This is now rare, and a mint copy with a dust cover is worth hundreds of pounds. The same year, Warne published a second Observer's book on British wild flowers. A mint copy of this book is worth around £220. When the popularity of these was recognized, several more titles were added 'uniform in the series', but during World War II production was limited due to paper and labour shortages. Even so, by 1941 Warne had published the first six Observer's books.

In 1942 a special edition book was brought out on "airplanes" . This book had no number in the series, as it was brought out to help people spot enemy warplanes. It was reprinted in 1943 and 1945. 

The first few Observer's titles had focused on nature, but gradually subjects like geology, music and architecture were introduced. 'Spotter' titles like Aircraft, Automobiles and Railway Locomotives proved successful.

When Warne was acquired by Penguin Books in 1983, Warne brought out new editions of the Observer's books. These were slightly larger than the original books, and were in paperback, not hardback. The same year Penguin, started publishing their own, more up-to-date Observer's books. These again were of a marginally increased size over the originals, but were hardbacks. Like the later original Observer's books, the dust covers were laminated to the actual book. There were two types of the Penguin Observer's books: Bloomsbury Observer's, and Claremont Observer's, (of which there were only 12 different editions).

After a hiatus of 17 years, Peregrine Books published the appropriately titled Observer's Book of Observer's Books in 1999, in a format that matched the original editions and was numbered 99 so as to follow on from the last 'official' title. As the title implies, it is a guide to the series with details of its history, authors, and print-runs. As a sign of the series' collectability, this potentially obscure book has been reprinted no fewer than six times. The series was rounded up to 100 with the publication of Wayside and Woodland in 2003.

List of Observer's Books

References

Reference works
Series of non-fiction books
Book series introduced in 1937
Frederick Warne & Co books